The Von River is a river in New Zealand, flowing into Lake Wakatipu. It was named after explorer Nicholas von Tunzelmann.

See also
List of rivers of New Zealand

References

Rivers of Otago
Rivers of New Zealand